The sport of association football in the country of Grenada is run by the Grenada Football Association. The association administers the national football team, as well as the Grenada Premier Division.

See also
Football in Grenada
List of football clubs in Grenada

References